The Gloucestershire Echo is a local weekly newspaper based in Gloucester, England. Published every Thursday, it covers the areas of Bishops Cleeve, Cheltenham, Moreton-in-Marsh, Northleach, Stow-on-the-Wold and Tewkesbury. The newspaper is headquartered at Gloucester Quays.

History 
The Gloucestershire Echo was founded in 1873.

In 2012, Local World acquired owner Northcliffe Media from Daily Mail and General Trust. The newspaper is now owned by Reach plc, publisher of the Daily Express and Daily Mirror national newspapers.

Until it went weekly with its October 12, 2017 issue, the Gloucestershire Echo was a six-day-a-week daily newspaper produced by Gloucestershire Media, part of Reach plc.

Editor Rachael Sugden was appointed in October 2017 as the paper went weekly. She supplanted Matt Holmes, who had been in position since January 2015.

See also
The Citizen, a sister paper for the Gloucester area.

References and sources
References

Sources
Ian Jackson, "The provincial press and the community", Manchester University Press, 1971, p. 31

External links
Gloucestershire Echo

Northcliffe Media
Publications established in 1873
1873 establishments in England
Daily newspapers published in the United Kingdom
Newspapers published in Gloucestershire